Toldbodgade 12 is a listed warehouse at Toldbodgade 12 in central Copenhagen, Denmark.

History
The warehouse was built for a merchant named From  1807. Poul Kjærgaard's architectural firm was based in the building from 1964 to 1984. He was a professor at the Royal Danish Academy of Fine Arts' School of Architecture from 1953 to 82.  The building was listed by the Danish Heritage Agency in the Danish national registry of protected buildings in 1959.

Architecture
The building consists of four storeys and is five bays wide. It has a one-bay wall dormer with the remain of a hoist. The windows have shutters.

Today
The Danish Board of Technology Foundation has been based in the building.
In 2017, the organization moved to Hvidovre.
Other tenants include Better Collective and Yellowsunmedia.

References

External links
 Toldbodgade at indenforvoldene.dk

Warehouses in Copenhagen
Listed warehouses in Denmark
Buildings and structures completed in 1807
1807 establishments in Denmark